Parviturbo parvissima is a species of minute sea snail, a marine gastropod mollusk in the family Skeneidae.

Description
The size of the shell attains 1 mm.

Distribution
This marine species occurs off Réunion and the Cocos-Keeling Islands, Indian Ocean, but is apparently a Pacific species.

References

External links
 

parvissima
Gastropods described in 2001